Comfort Independent School District is a public school district based in the community of Comfort, Texas (USA).

Located in Kendall County, a portion of the district extends into Kerr County.

In 2009, the school district was rated "academically acceptable" by the Texas Education Agency.

Schools
Comfort High (Grades 9-12)
The school has separate mascots for its boys' and girls' teams: the boys' teams are called the Bobcats while the girls' teams are called the Deer.
Comfort Middle (Grades 6-8)
Comfort Elementary (Grades PK-5)

References

External links
Comfort ISD

School districts in Kendall County, Texas
School districts in Kerr County, Texas